Krims is a surname. Notable people with the surname include:

Les Krims (born 1942), American photographer 
Milton Krims (1904–1988), American screenwriter, journalist, and novelist

See also
Krim (disambiguation)
Crim (surname)